Lieberose (Lower Sorbian: Luboraz) is a town in the Dahme-Spreewald district, in Brandenburg, Germany. It is situated 25 km north of Cottbus.

History

During World War II, Lieberose forced labor camp, a subcamp of Sachsenhausen concentration camp was located here. (The subcamp, KL Lieberose, was a labour camp for the support point of SS- Division "Kurmark". The SS- Division "Kurmark" located in Lieberose and surrounding area.

Near the end of the war, Jewish prisoners were sent on a death march towards Sachsenhausen.

After World War II was the camp a prison camp for the soviet secret service (NKGB).

Demography

People from Lieberose 
 Dietrich von der Schulenburg (1849-1911), German politician and member of Prussian parliament

See also
Lieberose Photovoltaic Park

References

External links
  Official site
 

Localities in Dahme-Spreewald
Holocaust locations in Germany